Edward Craig Biddle (October 24, 1879 – December 22, 1947) was an American male tennis player who was active in the second decade of the 20th century.

Biography
Craig was born into the Biddle family, a prominent Philadelphia family, the youngest son of Edward Biddle and Emma Drexel Biddle. His mother was the daughter of the wealthy Philadelphia financier Anthony Joseph Drexel (1826–1893). His elder brother was Anthony Joseph Drexel Biddle Sr. Biddle was educated in private schools and abroad. In 1901, after his 21st birthday, he inherited approximately  $1 million from his maternal grandfather's estate.

In 1901, he married Laura Whelen of Philadelphia. Until World War I, the couple traveled extensively in Europe, socializing with European nobility and royalty. It was during this time that he began playing tennis frequently.

Biddle and his wife had three children: Craig Jr., George Drexel Biddle, and Laura May Biddle (who married William Rhinelander Stewart, Jr., sister of Anita of Braganza). He and his wife separated in 1917, and she died in 1925. He married a second time to Josephine Peet Wilmerding in 1926 but they divorced in 1945. His third marriage was to Alica Laura Savard, who had been his nurse, as he suffered from severe arthritis. Later in his life he lived at Rocky Brook Farm, Peace Dale, Rhode Island.

Tennis career
In 1920, he reached the final of the mixed doubles competition at the U.S. National Championships (now US Open) together with Molla Bjurstedt Mallory. They lost the final to Hazel Hotchkiss Wightman and Wallace F. Johnson in straight sets. His best singles performance in a Grand Slam tournament was reaching the quarterfinal of the U.S. National Championships in 1917, 1918 and 1921.

In September 1913, Biddle reached the final of the Montreux Autumn Meeting in Switzerland but was defeated by Anthony Wilding in three straight sets. In March 1920 he was runner-up at the Florida Tennis Championships, losing in the final in straight sets to Ichiya Kumagae.

Grand Slam finals

Mixed doubles

Runners-up (1)

References

External links

1879 births
1947 deaths
American male tennis players
Tennis players from Philadelphia
American socialites
Craig
Drexel family
American people of English descent
American people of Austrian descent
20th-century American people